Greenfield  Community  College is a secondary school on the outskirts of Newton Aycliffe and is one of three schools on the town. It was opened in 1974 and was visited by Tony Blair on 30 June 2000 when it was awarded specialist status as an Arts and Science College.

Greenfield provides a range of opportunities in and out of the classroom. The strength of the provision was noted by OFSTED, who rated the school as Requires Improvement in May 2017 and again in September 2019.

In 2015, the school expanded following the closure of another local school Sunnydale Comprehensive in nearby Shildon. The school now operates in both towns. This is achieved by the movement of both staff and students. Year 10 and 11 attend most of their lessons in Newton Aycliffe.

Greenfield's uniform consists of tie; white shirt; blazer; dress, trousers or skirt and smart black shoes. Jumpers are optional. The P.E kit is a green t-shirt with the school logo which is to be worn with either black shorts or leggings and trainers with white soles. No branded clothing is allowed. Blazers are to be worn all year round. With request, students can remove their blazer for lessons but it must at all other times.

The previous colour system of Red, Orange, Yellow, Green, Blue and Purple was replaced with a new system renaming them Mountain, River, Forest and Lake. Each of these all have separate sub groups which are used for T4S (Time 4 Success/tutor group) 

A SENCO team are also within the school dealing with children with additional needs. The school also has adaptations within the site for pupils with disabilities.

The schools have a progress and guidance team.

Further details regarding the school can be accessed on the following link.

Ofsted Report Judgements 

 2019 - Requires Improvement 
 2017 - Requires Improvement 
 2012 - Good
 2009 - Satisfactory
 2006 - Good

Local school comparison

Progress 8 

Results from 2020 and 2021 were not published due to exam disruptions caused by the COVID pandemic.

The UTC is a was a new school and therefore the first published results were 2018.

Legacy GCSE Data 

Percentage achieving 5+ A*-C GCSEs including English and Mathematics

References

https://get-information-schools.service.gov.uk/Groups/Group/Details/1033

External links
 

1974 establishments in England
Secondary schools in County Durham
Educational institutions established in 1974
Foundation schools in County Durham
Newton Aycliffe